Valeri Vadimovich Ganus (born 25 November 1998) is a Russian football player. He plays for FC Saturn Ramenskoye.

Club career
He made his debut in the Russian Football National League for FC Yenisey Krasnoyarsk on 20 July 2019 in a game against FC Rotor Volgograd.

References

External links
 Profile by Russian Football National League
 
 

1998 births
Sportspeople from Krasnoyarsk
Living people
Russian footballers
Association football defenders
FC Yenisey Krasnoyarsk players
FC KAMAZ Naberezhnye Chelny players
FC Chayka Peschanokopskoye players
FC Saturn Ramenskoye players
Russian First League players
Russian Second League players